Liga Deportiva Universitaria de Quito's 2014 season was the club's 84th year of existence, the 61st year in professional football, and the 53rd in the top level of professional football in Ecuador.

Club

Personnel
President: Carlos Arroyo
Honorary President: Rodrigo Paz
President of the Executive Commission: Esteban Paz
President of the Football Commission: Edwin Ripalda
Vice-President of the Football Commission: Patricio Torres
Sporting manager: Santiago Jácome

Coaching staff
Manager: Luis Zubeldía
Assistant manager: Maximiliano Cuberas, Carlos Grueso
Physical trainer: Lucas Vivas
Goalkeeper trainer: Gustavo Flores

Kits
Supplier: Umbro
Sponsor(s): Budweiser, Chevrolet, Tropical, Discover, DirecTV, Roland

Squad information
Liga's squad for the season is allowed a maximum of four foreign players at any one time, and a maximum of eight throughout the season. At the start of the season, Liga was mandated to start one under-19 player in each match. The jersey numbers in the main table (directly below) refer to the number on their domestic league jersey. The under-19 players will wear a jersey number of at least #50.

Note: Caps and goals are of the national league and are current as of the beginning of the season.

Winter transfers

Summer transfers
On May 13, 2014, Liga de Quito announced that Eduardo Ledesma and Luciano Balbi left the club. The club hired Gerardo Alcoba and Jonathan Ramis as the new foreign players.

Competitions

Pre-season friendlies

Serie A

2014 was LDU Quito's 53rd season in the Serie A.

First stage

Second stage

Player statistics

Last updated: December 14, 2014Note: Players in italics left the club mid-season.Source:

Team statistics

Last updated: December 14, 2014 Source:Competitive matches

References

2014
Ecuadorian football clubs 2014 season